The year 1995 is the third year in the history of Pancrase, a mixed martial arts promotion based in the Japan. In 1995 Pancrase held 10 events beginning with, Pancrase: Eyes of Beast 1.

Events list

Pancrase: Eyes of Beast 1

Pancrase: Eyes of Beast 1 was an event held on January 26, 1995, at The Aichi Budokan in Nagoya, Aichi, Japan.

Results

Pancrase: Eyes of Beast 2

Pancrase: Eyes of Beast 2 was an event held on March 10, 1995, at the Yokohama Cultural Gymnasium in Yokohama, Kanagawa, Japan.

Results

Pancrase: Eyes of Beast 3

Pancrase: Eyes of Beast 3 was an event held on April 8, 1995, at Aichi Budokan in Nagoya, Aichi, Japan.

Results

Pancrase: Eyes of Beast 4

Pancrase: Eyes of Beast 4 was an event held on May 13, 1995, at Tokyo Bay NK Hall in Urayasu, Chiba, Japan.

Results

Pancrase: Eyes of Beast 5

Pancrase: Eyes of Beast 5 was an event held on June 13, 1995, at Sapporo Nakashima Gymnasium in Sapporo, Hokkaido, Japan.

Results

Pancrase: 1995 Neo-Blood Tournament Opening Round

Pancrase: 1995 Neo-Blood Tournament Opening Round was an event held on July 22, 1995, at Korakuen Hall in Tokyo, Japan.

Results

Pancrase: 1995 Neo-Blood Tournament Second Round

Pancrase: 1995 Neo-Blood Tournament Second Round was an event held on July 23, 1995, at Korakuen Hall in Tokyo, Japan.

Results

Pancrase: 1995 Anniversary Show

Pancrase: 1995 Anniversary Show was an event held on September 1, 1995, at Ryogoku Kokugikan in Tokyo, Japan.

Results

Pancrase: Eyes of Beast 6

Pancrase: Eyes of Beast 6 was an event held on November 4, 1995, at Yokohama Cultural Gymnasium in Yokohama, Kanagawa, Japan.

Results

Pancrase: Eyes of Beast 7

Pancrase: Eyes of Beast 7 was an event held on December 14, 1995, at the Sapporo Nakashima Gymnasium in Sapporo, Hokkaido, Japan.

Results

See also 
 Pancrase
 List of Pancrase champions
 List of Pancrase events

References

Pancrase events
1995 in mixed martial arts